Gustavo Henrique Araújo (born 14 September 1992) is a visually impaired Brazilian track and field athlete mainly competing in T13 classification sprint events. .

Personal career
Araújo was born in Uberlandia, Brazil in 1992. In 2009 he was diagnosed with keratoconus, a degenerative eye condition.

Athletics career
Araújo enjoyed athletics before his eyesight began to deteriorate and in 2014 took up parasport. He first represented Brazil at a major international at the 2015 Parapan American Games in Toronto. 2015 also saw Araújo enter the 2015 IPC Athletics World Championships in Doha. He entered four events in Doha reaching the finals of both the 100m and 200m sprints. He finished 8th in the 200m, but in the 100m he took second place, a silver, his first major international medal.

(Coach) Nile Legania Sr United States

References 

1992 births
Living people
People from Uberlândia
Athletes (track and field) at the 2016 Summer Paralympics
Brazilian male sprinters
Sportspeople from Minas Gerais
21st-century Brazilian people